Livio Loi (born 27 April 1997 in Hasselt) is a Belgian professional Grand Prix motorcycle racer. In 2015, Loi returned to the series with RW Racing GP. After scoring 15 points in the first half of the season, Loi achieved his first Grand Prix victory at Indianapolis; in a wet-to-dry race, Loi started the race on slick tyres, and finished almost 40 seconds clear of the next rider, John McPhee. In 2016, Loi continued with the same team and the same bike as in the 2015 season, finishing all the races during the season, scoring 63 points and an 18th place in the rider's championship. Midway through the 2018 season he was replaced by Vicente Pérez due to poor results.

Career statistics

Grand Prix motorcycle racing

By season

Races by year
(key) (Races in bold indicate pole position; races in italics indicate fastest lap)

References

External links

1997 births
Living people
Belgian motorcycle racers
Moto3 World Championship riders
Sportspeople from Hasselt
Supersport 300 World Championship riders